In organic chemistry, a dithiocarbamate is a functional group with the general formula  and structure .  It is the analog of a carbamate in which both oxygen atoms are replaced by sulfur atoms (when only 1 oxygen is replaced the result is thiocarbamate).

A common example is sodium diethyldithiocarbamate.  Dithiocarbamates and their derivatives are widely used in the vulcanization of rubber.

Formation
Many primary and secondary amines react with carbon disulfide and sodium hydroxide to form dithiocarbamate salts:
R2NH  +  CS2  +  NaOH   →   R2NCS2−Na+  +  H2O
Ammonia reacts with CS2 similarly:
2 NH3  +  CS2   →   H2NCS2−NH4+
Dithiocarbamate salts are pale colored solids that are soluble in water and polar organic solvents.

Reactions
Dithiocarbamates are readily S-alkylated.  Thus, methyl dimethyldithiocarbamate can be prepared by methylation of the dithiocarbamate:
(CH3)2NCS2Na  +  (CH3O)2SO2   →   (CH3)2NC(S)SCH3  +  Na[CH3OSO3]

Oxidation of dithiocarbamates gives the thiuram disulfide:
2 R2NCS2−  →  [R2NC(S)S]2  +  2e−

Thiuram disulfides react with Grignard reagents to give esters of dithiocarbamic acid:
[R2NC(S)S]2  +  R'MgX   →   R2NC(S)SR'  +  R2NCS2MgX

Dithiocarbamates react with transition metal salts to give a wide variety of transition metal dithiocarbamate complexes.

Structure and bonding
Dithiocarbamates are described by invoking resonance structures that emphasize the pi-donor properties of the amine group. This bonding arrangement is indicated by a short C–N distance and the coplanarity of the NCS2 core as well as the atoms attached to N.

Because of the pi-donation from nitrogen, dithiocarbamates are more basic than structurally related anions such as dithiocarboxylates and xanthates. Consequently, they tend to bind as bidentate ligands. Another consequence of the C–N multiple bonding is that rotation about that bond is subject to a high barrier.

Applications

Several transition metal dithiocarbamate complexes are useful in industry. Zinc dithiocarbamates are used to modify the crosslinking of certain polyolefins with sulfur, a process called vulcanization.  They are used as ligands for chelating metals.

Some dithiocarbamates, specifically ethylene bisdithiocarbamates, in the form of complexes with manganese (maneb), zinc (zineb) or a combination of manganese and zinc (mancozeb), have been used extensively as fungicides in agriculture since the 1940s. In the United States they began to be registered for use in the late 1950s and early 1960s and were quickly put to work on sooty blotch and flyspeck. Many growers switched from captan to EBDCs for the longer residual period. Both captan and EBDCs were the primary treatments for SBFS in that country until the early 1990s when the US Environmental Protection Agency banned EBDCs within 77 days to harvest. This effectively made summer use impossible, reduced EBDC use overall, and radically increased SBFS.

See also
 Xanthate

References

CYP3A4 inhibitors
Functional groups